Manuela Henkel (born 4 December 1974 in Neuhaus am Rennweg, Bezirk Suhl) is a German cross-country skier who has competed since 1994. She won a gold medal in the 4 × 5 km relay at the 2002 Winter Olympics in Salt Lake City. Her best individual finish was 12th in the Individual sprint at the 2006 Winter Olympics in Turin. She is the older sister of Andrea Henkel, a biathlete.

Henkel also won a gold in the 4 × 5 km relay at the 2003 FIS Nordic World Ski Championships and earned her best individual finish of 9th in the 15 km event at those same games. She has won three individual races in her career, all under 5 km in 1995, 2000, and 2005.

Henkel's local ski club is the WSV Oberhof.

Cross-country skiing results
All results are sourced from the International Ski Federation (FIS).

Olympic Games
 1 medal – (1 gold)

World Championships
 1 medal – (1 gold)

a.  Cancelled due to extremely cold weather.

World Cup

Season standings

Individual podiums
 8 podiums – (8 )

Team podiums
 2 victories – (2 ) 
 16 podiums – (13 , 3 )

References

External links
 
 
 
  

1974 births
Living people
People from Neuhaus am Rennweg
People from Bezirk Suhl
German female cross-country skiers
Sportspeople from Thuringia
Olympic cross-country skiers of Germany
Cross-country skiers at the 2006 Winter Olympics
Cross-country skiers at the 1998 Winter Olympics
Cross-country skiers at the 2002 Winter Olympics
Olympic gold medalists for Germany
Medalists at the 2002 Winter Olympics
Olympic medalists in cross-country skiing
FIS Nordic World Ski Championships medalists in cross-country skiing
20th-century German women